Belarmino is a 1964 film.

Belarmino may also refer to:

 Belarmino Salgado (born 1966), Cuban judoka
 Belarmino Tomás (1892–1950), Asturian trade unionist and socialist politician
 Teody Belarmino (born 1922), Filipino actor